The John Reames Memorial Trophy is an annual one-off contest between Lincoln City and invited opposition  at Sincil Bank Stadium (home of the Imps) in Lincoln, Lincolnshire, East Midlands.  Since inauguration in 2008, the trophy is named after and played in honour of former long-term Lincoln City chairman John Reames.

References 

Lincoln City F.C.
English football friendly trophies
Football cup competitions in England
Football in Lincolnshire
Sport in Lincoln, England
Recurring sporting events established in 2009
2009 establishments in England